Heman Judd Redfield (December 27, 1788 – July 22, 1877) was an American politician from New York.

Life
Redfield was born on December 27, 1788, in Suffield, Hartford County, Connecticut. He was the son of Peleg Redfield (1762–1852) and Mary (Judd) Redfield (1765–1844). The family were neighbors of Oliver Phelps who opened a land sales office in Suffield, Ct, after the Phelps and Gorham Purchase.

He attended Canandaigua Academy from 1808 to 1810, and then studied law with John Canfield Spencer.

Career
During the War of 1812, he enlisted as a private and fought in the Battle of Queenston Heights, and in November 1813 at Fort George, Ontario where he received from the commanding general William Henry Harrison a brevet for gallant services.

He was admitted to the bar in 1815, and commenced practice at Le Roy.

He was appointed District Attorney of Genesee County in 1821. He was Postmaster of Le Roy for more than twenty years. He was a member of the New York State Senate from 1823 to 1825, representing the eighth district which consisted of Allegany, Cattaraugus, Chautauqua, Erie, Genesee, Livingston, Monroe, Niagara and Steuben counties.

In 1826, he was offered the position of Special Counsel to the New York State Attorney General for the trials against the abductors of William Morgan, but declined, recommending John Canfield Spencer who was chosen.

On May 9, 1835, Redfield was elected a Canal Commissioner by the New York State Legislature to fill the vacancy caused by the resignation of Michael Hoffman, but he declined to take office. The Legislature adjourned on May 11, and left Governor William L. Marcy to appoint John Bowman instead.

When the Holland Land Company sold out their land in 1836, he became land agent for the new proprietors and moved to Batavia, New York.

President Franklin Pierce appointed Redfield Naval Officer of the Port of New York, and on November 1, 1853, Collector of the Port of New York. He resigned on July 1, 1857, and retired from politics.

Personal life
On January 27, 1817, he married Abigail Noyes Gould (1795–1841), and they had fourteen children.

On April 14, 1846, he married Constance Collins Bolles (1813–1909), and they had four children.

Redfield died in Batavia, New York on July 22, 1877.

References

External links

 

 

1788 births
1877 deaths
People from Le Roy, New York
Erie Canal Commissioners
New York (state) state senators
County district attorneys in New York (state)
Collectors of the Port of New York
New York (state) postmasters
People from Suffield, Connecticut
19th-century American politicians